Sofia Evgenevna Konukh (born 9 March 1980 in Chelyabinsk) is a Russian water polo player, who won the bronze medal at the 2000 Summer Olympics, the first Olympic women's tournament in history. She is one of four female players who competed in water polo at four Olympics. She is also a leading goalscorer in Olympic water polo history, with 31 goals.

She finished first with the Russia team at the 2006 European Championships in Belgrade, Serbia.

She participated at the 
2003 World Aquatics Championships,
2007 World Aquatics Championships,
2009 World Aquatics Championships, and
2011 World Aquatics Championships,

See also
 Russia women's Olympic water polo team records and statistics
 List of Olympic medalists in water polo (women)
 List of players who have appeared in multiple women's Olympic water polo tournaments
 List of women's Olympic water polo tournament top goalscorers
 List of World Aquatics Championships medalists in water polo

References

External links
 

1980 births
Living people
Russian female water polo players
Olympic water polo players of Russia
Water polo players at the 2000 Summer Olympics
Water polo players at the 2004 Summer Olympics
Water polo players at the 2008 Summer Olympics
Water polo players at the 2012 Summer Olympics
Olympic bronze medalists for Russia
Olympic medalists in water polo
World Aquatics Championships medalists in water polo
Medalists at the 2000 Summer Olympics
21st-century Russian women